Vishweshwar Hegde Kageri (born 10 July 1961) is an Indian politician who is the 23rd and current Speaker of the Karnataka Legislative Assembly since 31 July 2019. He is the member of Bharatiya Janata Party in Karnataka. He is six-term MLA from Sirsi. 
He served as the Minister for Primary and Secondary Education from 2008 to 2013 in the Government of Karnataka.

He completed his B.Com. from Karnatak University, Dharwad. He was an Akhil Bharatiya Vidyarthi Parishad office bearer during his college days and was an influential students union leader.

He represented the Ankola Vidhan Sabha constituency for 3 terms: 1994–99, 1999–04 and 2004–2008. After the delimitation process, he shifted to the newly created Sirsi constituency and won the seat in 2008, 2013 and 2018 elections. He served as MLA for 5 terms in his political career & is renowned as a very disciplined politician.

References

External links
Vishweshwar Hegde Kageri affidavit
Instagram
Twitter

Living people
State cabinet ministers of Karnataka
People from Uttara Kannada
1961 births
Bharatiya Janata Party politicians from Karnataka
Karnataka MLAs 2018–2023